Derek Anthony Enright (2 August 1935 – 31 October 1995) was a Labour Party politician in the United Kingdom.

Early life
Born in Thornaby-on-Tees, North Riding of Yorkshire, he attended St. Michael's College on St John's Road, Leeds (which has since merged with Mount St Mary's Catholic High School), then a grammar school. He was educated at Wadham College, Oxford, gaining a BA in Classics and a DipEd, and worked as a school teacher of classics at The John Fisher School, a Roman Catholic grammar school in Purley, London from 1959 to 1967. He taught at St Wilfrid's Catholic High School in the 1970s, where he taught students to sing "Yellow Submarine" and "Ten Green Bottles" in Latin. He also played a convincing Pharaoh in Joseph and the Amazing Technicolor Dreamcoat.

Parliamentary career
He was elected as a Labour Member of the European Parliament (MEP) for Leeds in 1979, staying until 1984. He was British Labour group spokesman on third world affairs and women's rights, and was later an EC delegate in Guinea Bissau. He contested Kent East in the 1984 European election. He was Member of Parliament (MP) for Hemsworth, West Yorkshire from 1991 until his death in 1995.  In 1990, he was a co-founder of the cross-party Movement for Christian Democracy, portions of which later evolved into the Christian Peoples Alliance.

Sings "Yellow Submarine" in Latin in the Commons chamber
On 2 March 1993, during a debate on the Education Reform Bill, Enright mentioned that "To help my pupils discover what the optative and subjunctive are all about, I translated Beatles songs into Latin." Challenged by Nicholas Fairbairn to sing a Beatles song in Latin, Enright immediately stood up and did so, singing "Yellow Submarine" in Latin. The Deputy Speaker, Geoffrey Lofthouse, got him to curtail his performance by reminding Enright of the rules of the House: "Order. The hon. Gentleman has been a Member of the House long enough to know its rules full well."

Personal life
He married Jane Simmons in 1963, and they had two sons and two daughters. He died from cancer aged 60. His son, Duncan Enright, stood against Michael Heseltine in Henley at the 1997 general election, and against David Cameron in Witney at the 2015 general election. Duncan is a councillor in Witney, Oxfordshire.

References

External links
 Derek Enright singing Yellow Submarine in Latin in the House of Commons (2 March 1993)
 Independent obituary
 They Work For You
 His contributions at Hansard

1935 births
1995 deaths
Labour Party (UK) MPs for English constituencies
UK MPs 1987–1992
UK MPs 1992–1997
Labour Party (UK) MEPs
Alumni of Wadham College, Oxford
Politicians from Leeds
MEPs for England 1979–1984
People educated at Mount St Mary's Catholic High School, Leeds